Hatfield House is a 17th-century manor house in Hertfordshire, England, a prime example of Jacobean architecture. 

Hatfield House may also refer to:
 The Hatfield House, a pub in Belfast, Northern Ireland
 Hatfield House (Philadelphia, Pennsylvania), United States, a historic house
 Hartfield House, Dumbarton, Scotland, a British Army base

See also
 Hatfield Manor House, South Yorkshire, England, an 18th-century manor house, on the site of buildings built centuries earlier
 Hatfield Plantation, a historic plantation and mansion in Brenham, Texas, US